Swamp Sally is an album by pianist Kenny Barron and multi-instrumentalist Mino Cinelu recorded in New York in 1995 and first released on the Verve label.

Reception 

The review on Allmusic noted "This unusual collaboration between pianist Kenny Barron and multi-instrumentalist Mino Cinelu is as difficult to categorize as it is to ignore. The duo covers an extraordinary amount of stylistic ground on the session; though, as the title suggests, things are mostly rooted in a New Orleans flavor. However, this is only a single thread running through the larger tapestry of the music".

Track listing 
All compositions by Mino Cinelu except where noted.
 "Louisiana Memories (Part 1)" – 3:33
 "Relentless Pursuit" (Kenny Barron) – 10:19
 "Simple Thoughts" (Barron, Cinelu) – 4:11
 "Swamp Sally" – 5:27
 "Mystère" (Barron) – 6:37
 "Moon Dance" – 3:29
 "Such a Touch" – 4:30
 "Beneath It All" (Barron) – 6:57
 "Shibui" (Barron) – 5:50
 "Louisiana Memories (Part 2)" – 5:29
 "Conversation" (Barron, Cinelu) – 4:02
 "Monique" – 5:05

Personnel 
Kenny Barron – piano, synthesizer, bass
Mino Cinelu – guitar, synthesizer, drums, percussion, vocals

References 

Kenny Barron albums
Mino Cinelu albums
1996 albums
Verve Records albums